For the 1969 Vuelta a España, the field consisted of 100 riders; 68 finished the race.

By rider

By nationality

References

1969 Vuelta a España
1969